Bhalukpong railway station is a small railway station in West Kameng district, Arunachal Pradesh. Its code is BHNG. It serves Bhalukpong town. The station consists of 3 platform. A new station building and platform with good shelters have been built on newly converted broad-gauge line. And facilities including water and sanitation have been provided.

Major trains 

 Dekargaon–Bhalukpong Passenger
 Rangiya–Bhalukpong Passenger

References

Railway stations in West Kameng district
Rangiya railway division